Phosgene oxime,  or CX, is an organic compound with the formula Cl2CNOH. It is a potent chemical weapon, specifically a nettle agent. The compound itself is a colorless solid, but impure samples are often yellowish liquids. It has a strong, disagreeable and irritating odor. It is used as a reagent in organic chemistry.

Preparation and reactions
Phosgene oxime can be prepared by reduction of chloropicrin using a combination of tin metal and hydrochloric acid as the source of the active hydrogen reducing acent:

The observation of a transient violet color in the reaction suggests intermediate formation of trichloronitrosomethane (Cl3CNO). Early preparations, using stannous chloride as the reductant, also started with chloropicrin.

The compound is electrophilic and thus sensitive to nucleophiles, including bases, which destroy it:

Phosgene oxime has been used to prepare heterocycles that contain N-O bonds, such as isoxazoles.

Dehydrohalogenation upon contact with mercuric oxide generates cyanoformyl chloride, a reactive nitrile oxide:
Cl2CNOH  →  ClCNO  +  HCl

Toxicity
Phosgene oxime is classified as a vesicant even though it does not produce blisters. It is toxic by inhalation, ingestion, or skin contact.  The effects of the poisoning occur almost immediately. No antidote for phosgene oxime poisoning is known. Generally, any treatment is supportive. Typical physical symptoms of CX exposure are as follows:
Skin: Blanching surrounded by an erythematous ring can be observed within 30 seconds of exposure. A wheal develops on exposed skin within 30 minutes. The original blanched area acquires a brown pigmentation by 24 hours. An eschar forms in the pigmented area by 1 week and sloughs after approximately 3 weeks. Initially, the effects of CX can easily be misidentified as mustard gas exposure. However, the onset of skin irritation resulting from CX exposure is a great deal faster than mustard gas, which typically takes several hours or more to cause skin irritation.
Eyes: Eye examination typically demonstrates conjunctivitis, lacrimation, lid edema, and blepharospasm after even minute exposures. More severe exposures can result in keratitis, iritis, corneal perforation, and blindness.
Respiratory: Irritation of the mucous membranes may be observed on examination of the oropharynx and nose. Evidence of pulmonary edema, including rales and wheezes, may be noted on auscultation. Pulmonary thromboses are prominent features of severe CX exposure.
Gastrointestinal: Some animal data suggest that CX may cause hemorrhagic inflammatory changes in the GI tract.

References

External links
 EMedicine: Urticants, Phosgene Oxime
 Center for the Study of Bioterrorism: Phosgene Oxime
 Centers for Disease Control: Facts About Phosgene Oxime
 Virtual Naval Hospital: Phosgene Oxime

Chemical weapons
Organochlorides
Oximes